Geji, also translated as Gejizhen, is a town on the Tibetan Plateau in Gê'gyai County in Ngari Prefecture of the Tibet Autonomous Region of China.

Administrative divisions 
Geji administers the following two residential communities and five administrative villages:

 Napu Community
 Fukang Community
 Bugong Village
 Kangbalie Village
 Senbu Village
 Gongqian Village
 Mangla Village

See also

 List of populated places in the Tibet Autonomous Region
 List of villages in China

References

External links
 "Dare to drive the dangerous Debo La". Quote: "The pass is 150 km (93 miles) long, running from Gejizhen to Xungba."
 Gejizhen on Google Maps

Populated places in Ngari Prefecture
Villages in China